Michael Anderson (born February 4, 1985) is a Canadian curler from Markham, Ontario. He is a Canadian University champion.

Career
Anderson is most notable for leading the Laurier Golden Hawks men's curling team to a national university championship in 2008. This qualified the rink to represent Canada at the 2009 Winter Universiade. The team finished in 6th place, with a 4-5 record.

Anderson also won the provincial Junior Mixed championship in 2006.

As of 2012, Anderson has played in three World Curling Tour events, and has yet to win a tournament.

Anderson playedy in his third provincial men's championship after qualifying for the 2016 Ontario Tankard. His first was in 2010, when he played lead for Joe Frans.  His second was in 2012 Dominion Tankard when he skipped.

Anderson won the 2018 Canadian Mixed Curling Championship in Swan River, Manitoba, skipping his team out of the Thornhill Club, in November 2017.

Teammates
Men's (Toronto Cricket, Skating & Curling Club)
Mike Harris (Skip)
Scott Hodgson (second)
Scott Foster (lead)
Mixed (The Thornhill Club)
 Danielle Inglis (Third)
 Sean Harrison (second)
 Lauren Harrison (lead)

References

External links
 

Living people
1985 births
Sportspeople from Markham, Ontario
Canadian male curlers
Canadian mixed curling champions
Curlers from Ontario
World mixed curling champions
21st-century Canadian people